F1 is Formula One, the highest class of auto racing sanctioned by the FIA.

F1, F01, F.I, F.1 or F-1 may refer to:

Computing 
 F1, a computer Function key
 F1, an Office Assistant in Microsoft Office
 F1 Magazine, a Syrian monthly computer magazine published in Arabic
 Google F1, Google's SQL database management system (DBMS)
Oppo F1, a smartphone by Oppo Electronics

Military craft and weapons 
 F1 grenade (disambiguation), several types of hand grenade
 F 1 Hässlö, a former Swedish Air Force wing
 F1 SMG, an Australian submachine gun
 Dassault Mirage F1, a French combat aircraft
 FCM F1, a 1940 French super-heavy tank
 Fokker F.I, a German fighter triplane
 HMS F1, an F-class submarine of the Royal Navy, launched in 1915
 HMS Kelly (F01), a 1938 British Royal Navy K-class destroyer
 Kampfgeschwader 76, from its historic Geschwaderkennung code with the Luftwaffe in World War II
 Mitsubishi F-1, a fighter/attack aircraft of the Japan Air Self-Defense Force
 North American F-1 Fury, the FJ known as the F-1 from 1962 onward
 Sopwith Camel F.1, a 1916 British World War I single-seat fighter biplane
 USS F-1 (SS-20), an F-class submarine of the United States Navy
 Felixstowe F.1, a Seaplane Experimental Station-designed flying boat
 Fokker F.I (1919), an abortive design that served for the 1916 Fokker F.II airliner construction
 Avion MAI F-1, a sporting biplane
 FR F1, a French precision rifle

Science 
 F1 hybrid, a first-generation hybrid (or crossbreed) animal or plant
 F1-isoprostane, a type of isoprostane
 F1 layer, a layer of the ionosphere
 F1 score, a statistical performance measure of a test or classifier
 F-1 cubesat, a picosatellite developed in Vietnam
 Vascular dementia's ICD-10 code
 F1, a tornado intensity rating on the Fujita scale
 f1, the formant with the lowest frequency in acoustics and phonetics
 F-1 (nuclear reactor), the oldest operating research reactor
 NIST-F1, a cesium fountain clock and the United States' primary time and frequency standard
 F1, the field with one element

Vehicles 
 McLaren F1, a sports car
 BMW F01, an automobile platform
 F1, the project codename and development designation of the first Lexus vehicle
 NCC Class F1, a Northern Counties Committee Irish steam locomotive
 SECR F1 Class, a South Eastern and Chatham Railway, British steam locomotive
 SP&S Class F-1, an American steam locomotive class, of the Spokane, Portland and Seattle 700
 Ford F-Series, includes the F-1 pickup truck
 Finnish Steam Locomotive Class F1
 SpaceX Falcon 1 space launch rocket

Video games 
 F-1 Race, a 1984 game for the Famicom, later remade for Game Boy
 F1 (video game), a 1993 multiformat game by Domark/Tengen
 F1 Challenge, a 1995 Sega Saturn game by Virgin Interactive
 F1 Grand Prix (2005 video game), a PSP game by Traveller's Tales
 F1 2000 (video game), a game by Electronic Arts for the PlayStation
 Formula One 04, a game by Studio Liverpool for PS2
 Formula One 05, a game by Studio Liverpool for PS2
 Formula One 06, a game by Studio Liverpool for PS2 and PSP
 F1 (video game series), a racing video game franchise
 F1 2009 (video game), a game by Codemasters for Wii and PSP
 F1 2010 (video game), a multiformat game by Codemasters
 F1 2011 (video game), a multiformat game by Codemasters
 F1 2012 (video game), a multiformat game by Codemasters
 F1 Race Stars, a multiformat game by Codemasters
 F1 2013 (video game), a multiformat game by Codemasters
 F1 2014 (video game), a multiformat game by Codemasters
 F1 2015 (video game), a multiformat game by Codemasters
 F1 2016 (video game), a multiformat game by Codemasters
 F1 2017 (video game), a multiformat game by Codemasters
 F1 2018 (video game), a multiformat game by Codemasters
 F1 2019 (video game), a multiformat game by Codemasters
 F1 2020 (video game), a multiformat game by Codemasters
 F1 2021 (video game), a multiformat game by Codemasters and EA Sports

Other uses 
 F1 (classification), a wheelchair sport classification
 F-1 (rocket engine), powered first stage of the Saturn V rocket
 F1 Powerboat Racing
 F1 helmet, a French firefighting helmet
 F-01 (Michigan county highway)
 F1 Taksim–Kabataş funicular line, a railway line in Istanbul, Turkey
 F-1 visa, a visa category to enter United States as a student
 Canon F-1, a 1971 35 mm single-lens reflex camera
 BYD F0 or BYD F1, a car manufactured by BYD Auto
 F1 or Foundation Year 1, the first year of the UK Foundation Programme for postgraduate medical practitioners
 f1, Family 1, a group of Greek gospel manuscripts
 Sydney Ferries' Manly ferry services, known as the F1
 F1, the first formant

See also 
 F1 Racing, a Formula One magazine
 Formula One (disambiguation)